Ōrora Satoshi (born April 26, 1983 as Anatoliy Valeryevich Mihahanov) is a former sumo wrestler. His highest rank was makushita 43. He decided to retire from sumo in September 2018.

Career
He was born on April 26, 1983, in the small town of Zaigrayevo, Zaigrayevsky District, Buryatia in the Soviet Union. He had been extraordinarily large since childhood, and after seeing sumo on television for the first time at the age of eight he was inspired to become a sumo wrestler. In 1999 at the age of 16 he moved with his family to St.Petersburg so he could study sumo. There he was scouted by the 55th yokozuna Kitanoumi, joining Kitanoumi stable in March 2000. He was the first Russian to enter professional sumo. He was given the shikona of Ōrora, a reference to the aurora.

Ōrora spent most of his career in the fourth-highest sandanme division, which he first reached in May 2002. He had nine tournaments ranked in the third-highest makushita division, which he first reached in January 2008, peaking at Makushita 43 East in November 2011. His last appearance in the division was in January 2014. He served as a tsukebito or personal attendant to Kitanoumi for fourteen years until his stablemaster's death in November 2015, upon which his stable was renamed Yamahibiki with the former maegashira Ganyū becoming his stablemaster.  His career record was 376 wins against 382 losses, with 12 absences due to injury, over 111 tournaments.

Weight

He recalled on one occasion ordering 50 servings of yakiniku, plus six bowls of ramen noodles. After reaching  in the January 2017 health check-up he tried changing his diet, eating only once a day and taking more exercise by walking around his heya. However, he did not check his weight on a scale until the next health check-up on 22 August 2017, and in the seven months since he had, in fact, increased his weight by another five kilograms to reach , surpassing former ōzeki Konishiki's  set in 1996 to become the heaviest wrestler ever in professional sumo. Ōrora remarked that he had not been aiming for the record but at least would now have a place in history. He joked that a rice ball eaten as a snack must have put him over.

Retirement
In September 2017 he was demoted to jonidan, a division in which he had not competed since 2003. In September 2018 he announced his retirement after winning his final match to give him a 1–6 record at the rank of jonidan 12. Speaking to reporters he paid tribute to his late stablemaster Kitanoumi, and said his most memorable match was his victory over a young Hakuhō in September 2001. After a retirement ceremony at his stable, he returned to Russia on October 7, 2018. He was planning to find a job in sports events. Based once again in his hometown in Siberia, he has a large social media following. He announced on his Instagram account in April 2020 that since retiring he had lost 100 kg. Speaking to the Asahi Shimbun in June 2020, said he had now switched to five small meals a day, does not eat after 7 pm, walks 6 kilometres a day and goes to a gym. He said that it was difficult to stay healthy while living in a sumo stable as "you are the only person that can take care of you. Nobody in your sumo stable cares about you." While active he suffered from hypertension and fatigue, and would require an oxygen tank for taking short walks.

Fighting style

Ōrora had a huge weight advantage over nearly all his opponents—his  advantage over the  wrestler Ohara in January 2012 was the largest disparity ever in a professional sumo bout, though in this bout he was beaten by the smaller wrestler when stepping out of the ring during a throw attempt. On the twelfth day of the September 2001 tournament he won with the extremely rare technique of tsukaminage or lifting throw, which can only be achieved against opponents much lighter than oneself and had not been seen in a tournament since Tokitsuyama won with it in November 1957. He also enjoyed employing the rare kimarite of kimedashi, or arm-barring force-out, and was credited with this technique 41 times as of July 2017, by far the most among his contemporaries. His most common winning technique was a straightforward force out or yori-kiri. However, Ōrora was severely restricted by his lack of speed and agility, and only won around half his bouts. Many of his opponents simply circled him, waiting for him to tire.

Career record
Note: Six official basho or tournaments are held each year—the Hatsu (First), Haru (Spring), Natsu (Summer), Nagoya, Aki (Autumn) and Kyushu. Wrestlers in lower divisions fight seven bouts per tournament.

See also
List of past sumo wrestlers
List of heaviest sumo wrestlers
List of non-Japanese sumo wrestlers

References

External links
Official Twitter account

1983 births
Living people
Russian sumo wrestlers
Russian expatriates in Japan
Sportspeople from Buryatia
Buryat people
People from Zaigrayevsky District